The Democratic Party was a short-lived political party in the early of the Republican period of China from 1912 to 1913.

History

It was formed by several groups of politicians of the late Qing Constitutional Movement on 27 September 1912 in Beijing after seeing the Nationalist Party (Kuomintang) and Republican emerged in the Provisional Senate of the Provisional Republican Government. Tang Hualong became the first Chairman of the party while Liang Qichao was the actual head. The radical faction split from the party after the party stood with the government's stance on the Russo-Mongolian Agreement on 3 November 1912.

Under Liang Qichao, the Democratic Party, Unity Party, and Republican Party merged into the Progressive Party on 29 May 1913. The Progressive Party became the flagship pro-Yuan party in the National Assembly.

See also

 List of political parties in the Republic of China
 1912 Republic of China National Assembly elections

References

1912 establishments in China
1913 disestablishments in China
Defunct political parties in China
Political parties disestablished in 1913
Political parties established in 1912
Political parties in the Republic of China